Sapranthus is a genus of flowering woody plants in the family Annonaceae. The genus was first described in 1866 by Berthold Carl Seemann.

Description 
Plants in this genus are shrubs or trees. The flowers are solitary and terminal and have six petals. The flowers have a characteristic foetid odour (giving the generic name) and are pollinated by beetles.

Species
Plants of the World Online gives the following as accepted species:
 Sapranthus campechianus (Kunth) Standl.
 Sapranthus chiapensis Standl. ex G.E.Schatz
 Sapranthus hirsutus van Rooden ex G.E.Schatz
 Sapranthus isae J.G.Vélez & Cogollo
 Sapranthus microcarpus (Donn.Sm.) R.E.Fr.
 Sapranthus palanga R.E.Fr.
 Sapranthus violaceus (Dunal) Saff.
 Sapranthus viridiflorus G.E.Schatz

Further reading

References

Annonaceae genera
Annonaceae
Taxa described in 1866
Taxa named by Berthold Carl Seemann